was a Japanese New Left extremist, author, and ecologist. His name is spelled "Ryu Ohta" as well.

Biography
He was born Tōichi Kurihara (栗原 登一) in Toyohara, Karafuto Prefecture. In October 1945, he joined the Democratic Youth League of Japan. In 1947, he joined the Japanese Communist Party. In 1953, he left the Japanese Communist Party. In 1955, he and Kanichi Kuroda established the Japan Revolutionary Communist League, thus becoming leader of the Fourth International in Japan. In 1957, he established the Japanese Trotskyist League (日本トロツキスト連盟 Nihon Trotskyist Renmei).

In 1970, he was sentenced to death by his former fellow members for leaving the Japanese Trotskyist League. He spearheaded Ainu Revolution Theory, grouping the Ainu within the lumpenproletariat. In 1971 he attempted to start an Ainu revolution but failed. He and the leader of the Ainu Liberation League were both arrested for inciting a riot and they continuously blamed each other.

In 1986, he established the Japanese Green Party, but it immediately split into two separate parties and both failed. In 1986, he authored a book called Japan Ecologist Proclamation, in which he proclaimed that "we must overthrow all human dictatorship! Free the cockroaches, free the rats, free the earthworms!" Since 1986, he was a candidate in three elections.   In the 1990s he became known as one of the principal publishers of antisemitic materials and Jewish conspiracy theories in Japan, as well as controversial writings on the destructive effects of Westernisation, including the aesthetic and moral superiority of Japanese women over Western women. He was also a self-styled Buddhist philosopher.

Affiliations
He was the leader of the following associations:

The Natural Life Academy (天寿学会, Tenju Gakkai)
The Civilization Critic Academy (文明批判学会, Bunmei Hihan Gakkai)
The Institute for Historical Verification (歴史修正研究所, Rekishi Shūsei Kenkyūjo)
The Institute for Universal Strategy (宇宙戦略研究所, Uchū Senryaku Kenkyūjo)
The Earth Restoration League (地球維新連盟, Chukyū Ishin Renmei)

He was also the author of UFO Theory and Space Civilization: Prospects for 21st Century Science.

Notes

External links

 English Biography

1930 births
2009 deaths
Ainu politics
Antisemitism in Japan
Former Marxists
Japanese Buddhists
Japanese conspiracy theorists
Japanese environmentalists
People from Yuzhno-Sakhalinsk
Tokyo University of Science alumni